Ulises Carrión (1941, San Andres Tuxtla, Mexico - 1989, Amsterdam, The Netherlands), considered as "perhaps Mexico’s most important conceptual artist",  is widely known for his decisive role in defining and conceptualising the artistic genre artists' book through his manifesto The New Art of Making Books (1975). But his alertness and interest in new forms of art and innovative operations implicated that he was active in most of the artistic fields of his time. The activities cover artworks, theory and independent initiatives. This includes not only a great number of bookworks - as he named artists' books - and unique artworks, but also performances, alongside film, video, and sound works, as well as several edition, publishing, and curating projects, a couple of considerable public projects, and various significant works and initiatives within the international community of mail artists during its most creative period. Equally essential for his artistic career is his engagement in several artists' run spaces. All his artistic activities were reflected by him in highly elaborated theories.

Career
Carrión was born in San Andres Tuxtla, Veracruz, Mexico in 1941. After studying philosophy and literature at the National University of Mexico, he started his career as a successful and respected young writer. In 1964 he received a grant for further studies at the Sorbonne Paris, France. Short after he went for studies to the Goethe Institute, Achenmühle, Germany, and to Leeds, England, where he studied English language and literature at the University and graduated with a diploma. In 1972 he definitively settled in Amsterdam, an open and cosmopolitan city with a lot of artistic innovation and international exchanges. Here he became co-founder and member of the In-Out Center (1972-1975). In 1975, he founded Other Books and So, the first space of its kind devoted to all kind of artists’ publications, which in 1979 became the Other Books And So Archive. He was also the co-founder of the Vereniging van Videokunstenaars, later Time Based Arts (1983-1993) in Amsterdam, NL. Ulises Carrión died in 1989 in Amsterdam.

Recent Reception
Due to a certain cult of the overlooked and underestimated (post-)1960s avant-garde, Ulises Carrión has undergone an extraordinary appreciation in a few years. Exhibitions of his works and a flood of references to his artistic strategies and theories in current art works, essays, conferences, as well as newly annotated, listed, translated, and edited works give proof of the widespread reception today. The widespread reception of his manifesto The New Art of Making Books made him the central reference for the definition of the concept of the artist book. Also his bookshop gallery Other Books and So became, despite its short duration, a mythologized paragon. In particular in Latin America, Ulises Carrión is received for some time as an important conceptual compatriot.

Exhibitions
Die Neue Kunst des Büchermachens, Weserburg, Bremen, 1992
We have Won! Haven't we?, Museum Fodor, Amsterdam, 1992
¿Mundos personales o estrategias culturales?, Museo de Arte Carrillo Gil, 2002
Ulises Carrión e a sua Livraria, Serralves, Porto, 2010
Gossip, Scandal and Good Manners: Works by Ulises Carrión, The Showroom, London, 2010
Dear Reader. Don't Read, Museo Nacional Centro de Arte Reina Sofía, Madrid, 2016  Museo Jumex, Mexico-City, 2017

Artist books and other writings (Incomplete Selection)
Carrión Ulises, De Alemania, Mexico, 1970
Carrión Ulises, Ed., From Bookworks to Mailworks, other books and so, Amsterdam, 1978
Carrión Ulises, Cres, Self-published, Amsterdam, 1978
Carrión Ulises, The Muxlows, Verlaggalerie Leaman, Düsseldorf, 1978
Carrión Ulises, Mirror box, Stempelplaats Amsterdam, 1979 
Carrión Ulises, Rubber Stamp Books, Lomholt Formular Press, Odder, 1979
Carrión Ulises, Namen en adressen, Agora - Studio, Maastricht, 1980
Carrión Ulises, Second Thoughts, VOID Distributors, Amsterdam, 1980
Carrión Ulises and Agius Juan J., Ed., Beeld Boeken, Galerie da Costa, Amsterdam, 1980
Carrión Ulises and Crozier Robin, et al, Kunst in der Öffentlichkeit, Marode Editions, Würzburg, 1981
Carrión Ulises, The New Art of Making Books. Nicosia : Aegean editions, 2001.

References

External links
 Selections from The New Art of Making Books
 Sound Work "The Poet's Tongue"
 Trailer "Bookworks Revisited"
 Exhibition catalogue "Dear Reader. Don't Read.", Museo Reina Sofia, Madrid 2016

Mexican artists
Mexican male writers
Conceptual artists
Book artists
Artists from Veracruz
Writers from Veracruz
1941 births
1989 deaths